Ashwani Sekhri  is an Indian politician and a member of Indian National Congress. He was a Member of Punjab Legislative Assembly (MLA) and represented Batala.

Early life
His father's name is Vishwa Mitter Sekhri.

Political career
Sekhri first successfully contested Punjab Legislative Assembly from Batala in 1985. He was re-elected from Batala in 2002 and 2012. In 2002, he was appointed Minister of State for Tourism and Culture. In 2009, he was appointed spokesperson of Punjab Pradesh Congress Committee. He was one of the 42 INC MLAs who submitted their resignation in protest of a decision of the Supreme Court of India ruling Punjab's termination of the Sutlej-Yamuna Link (SYL) water canal unconstitutional.

In 2022 Punjab Legislative Assembly election  he contested from Batala Assembly constituency but lost the election to Amansher Singh of Aam Aadmi Party.

References

Punjab, India MLAs 1985–1990
Punjab, India MLAs 2002–2007
Punjab, India MLAs 2012–2017
Indian National Congress politicians
Year of birth missing (living people)
Living people
Indian National Congress politicians from Punjab, India